.bm is the Internet country code top-level domain (ccTLD) for Bermuda. It was originally delegated in March 1993 to Bermuda College and was redelegated to the Registrar General of Bermuda, the de facto manager of the .BM domain, in 2007.

Structure 
Registrations are available under the second level .bm domain, as well as a number of third level domains.

See also

References

External links
 IANA .bm whois information

communications in Bermuda
computer-related introductions in 1993
country code top-level domains

sv:Toppdomän#B